Koksu District is a district of Jetisu Region in Kazakhstan. The administrative center of the district is the settlement of Balpyk Bi. It is named after the largest river in the area: Koksu River. Population:

References

Districts of Kazakhstan
Almaty Region